Pymore may refer to two places in England:

Pymoor, Cambridgeshire, a village sometimes called Pymore
Pymore, Dorset, a village